The Singing Revolution was a series of events in 1987–1990 that led to the restoration of independence of the three then Soviet-occupied Baltic countries of Estonia, Latvia, and Lithuania at the end of the Cold War. The term was coined by an Estonian activist and artist, Heinz Valk, in an article published a week after the 10–11 June 1988 spontaneous mass evening singing demonstrations at the Tallinn Song Festival Grounds.

Background

During World War II, the three Baltic countries were invaded and occupied by the Stalinist Soviet Union in June 1940, and formally annexed into the USSR in August 1940. Following the Nazi German occupation in 1941–1944/45, the three countries were reconquered by the Soviet army in 1944–1945. 

In 1985, the last leader of the former Soviet Union, Mikhail Gorbachev introduced glasnost ("openness") and perestroika ("restructuring"), hoping to stimulate the failing Soviet economy and encourage productivity, particularly in the areas of consumer goods, the liberalisation of cooperative businesses, and growing the service economy. Glasnost rescinded limitations on political freedoms in the Soviet Union, which led to problems for the Soviet central government in retaining control over non-Russian areas, including the occupied Baltic countries.

Hitherto unrecognised issues previously kept secret by the Soviet central government in Moscow were admitted to in public, causing further popular dissatisfaction with the Soviet regime in Estonia, Latvia and Lithuania. Combined with the war in Afghanistan and the nuclear fallout in Chernobyl, grievances were aired in a publicly explosive and politically decisive manner. Estonians were concerned about the demographic threat to their national identity posed by the influx of individuals from foreign ethnic groups to work on such large Soviet development projects as phosphate mining.

Access to Western émigré communities abroad and, particularly in Estonia, informal relations with Finland, and access to Finnish TV showing the Western lifestyle also contributed to widespread dissatisfaction with the Soviet system and provoked mass demonstrations as repression on dissidents, nationalists, religious communities, and ordinary consumers eased substantially towards the end of the 1980s.

Massive demonstrations against the Soviet regime began after widespread liberalisation of the regime failed to take into account national sensitivities. It was hoped by Moscow that the non-Russian nations would remain within the USSR despite the removal of restrictions on freedom of speech and national icons (such as the local pre-1940 flags). However, the situation deteriorated to such an extent that by 1989 there were campaigns aimed at freeing the nations from the Soviet Union altogether.

Estonia
The Soviet government's plan to excavate phosphorite in the Lääne-Viru county with potentially catastrophic consequences for the environment and society was revealed in February 1987. That started the "Phosphorite War" public environmental campaign. The MRP-AEG group held the Hirvepark meeting in the Old Town of Tallinn at the anniversary of Molotov–Ribbentrop Pact on 23 August 1987, demanding to disclose and condemn its secret protocol.

The "Five Patriotic Songs" series by Alo Mattiisen premiered at the Tartu Pop Festival in May 1988. In June the Old Town Festival was held in Tallinn, and after the official part of the festival, the participants moved to the Song Festival Grounds and started to sing patriotic songs together spontaneously. The Baltic Way, a human chain of two million people, spanned from Tallinn to Vilnius on 23 August 1989. Mattiisen's "Five Patriotic Songs" were performed again at the Rock Summer festival in Tallinn held on 26–28 August 1988. The Song of Estonia festival was held at the Song Festival Grounds on 11 September. Trivimi Velliste, Chairman of the Estonian Heritage Society, first voiced the public ambition to regain independence. The Supreme Soviet of Estonia issued the Estonian Sovereignty Declaration on 16 November.

The Singing Revolution lasted over four years, with various protests and acts of defiance. The revolution was led by three different groups: the Heritage Society, the Popular Front, and the National Independence Party. The Heritage Society, established in 1987, focused on spreading awareness about Estonia’s history to gather support for Estonia’s independence from the Soviets. The Popular Front, founded in 1988, wanted to reform Estonia into self-government within a loose confederation of the Soviet Union. The National Independence Party, established in 1988 as well, was more radical than the other two organizations and demanded complete independence from the Soviet Union. 

In 1991, as the central government in Moscow and the Soviet Army attempted to stop the Estonian progress towards independence, the newly elected legislature of Estonia together with an elected grassroots parliament, Congress of Estonia, proclaimed the restoration of the independent state of Estonia and repudiated Soviet legislation. Large groups of unarmed volunteers went to shield the parliament, radio and TV buildings from any attacks by Soviet troops. Through these actions Estonia regained its independence without any blood shed.

Independence was declared on the late evening of 20 August 1991, after an agreement between different political parties was reached. The next morning Soviet troops, according to Estonian TV, attempted to storm Tallinn TV Tower but were unsuccessful. The Communist hardliners' coup attempt failed amidst mass pro-democracy demonstrations in Moscow led by Boris Yeltsin.

On 22 August 1991, Iceland (independent country since 1944) announced the establishment of diplomatic relations with Estonia, and Iceland thus became the first foreign country to formally recognise the fully restored independence of Estonia in 1991. Today, a plaque commemorating this event is situated on the outside wall of the Foreign Ministry, which is on Islandi väljak 1, or "Iceland Square 1". The plaque reads; "The Republic of Iceland was the first to recognise, on 22 August 1991, the restoration of the independence of the Republic of Estonia", in Estonian, Icelandic and English.  Some other nations did not recognise the annexation of Estonia by the Soviet Union.

Latvia
During the second half of the 1980s as Mikhail Gorbachev introduced glasnost and perestroika in the USSR, which rolled back restrictions to freedom in the Soviet Union, aversion to the Soviet regime had grown into the third Latvian National Awakening, which reached its peak in mid-1988.

In 1986, it became widely known to the public that the USSR was planning to build another hydroelectric power plant on Latvia's largest river Daugava, and that a decision had been made to build a metro in Riga. Both of these projects planned by Moscow could have led to the destruction of Latvia's landscape and cultural and historical heritage. In the press journalists urged the public to protest against these decisions. The public reacted immediately, and in response, the Environmental Protection Club was founded on 28 February 1987. During the second half of the 1980s, the Environmental Protection Club became one of the most influential mass movements in the region and began to make demands for the restoration of Latvia's independence.

On 14 June 1987, the anniversary of the 1941 deportations, the human rights group "Helsinki-86", which had been founded a year earlier, organized people to place flowers at the Freedom Monument (Latvia's symbol of independence, which was erected in 1935). This is widely cited as the beginning of the National Awakening. However, the Latvian Song and Dance Festival of 1985 also had been sometimes named as such for choirs requesting and performing the song Gaismas pils conducted by Haralds Mednis after the main event. The song, which speaks about the rebirth of a free Latvian nation, usually a staple of the festival, had been removed from the repertoire; the conductor, disliked by Soviet authorities, was sidelined at the closing concert. He was called from his seat by the choir and 'Gaismas pils' was performed, airing live on Riga Television.

On 1 and 2 June 1988, the Writers' Union held a congress during which the democratization of society, Latvia's economic sovereignty, the cessation of immigration from the USSR, the transformation of industry, and the protection of Latvian language rights were discussed by delegates. Over the course of this conference, for the first time in post-war Latvia, the secret protocol of the Molotov–Ribbentrop Pact, which had determined Latvia's fate after 1939, was publicly acknowledged.

The congress of the Writers' Union stirred up public opinion and provided an additional stimulus for the general process of national revival.

In the summer of 1988, two of the most important organizations of the revival period began to assemble themselves—the Latvian People's Front and the Latvian National Independence Movement (LNIM). Soon afterwards the more radically inclined Citizens' Congress called for complete non-compliance with the representatives of the Soviet regime. All of these organisations had a common goal: the restoration of democracy and independence. On 7 October 1988, there was a mass public demonstration, calling for Latvia's independence and the establishment of a regular judicial order. On 8 and 9 October the first congress of the Latvian People's Front was held. This organization, which attracted 200,000 members, became the main representative of the return to independence.

On 23 August 1989, the fiftieth anniversary of the Molotov–Ribbentrop Pact, the People's Fronts of all three Baltic countries held a huge demonstration of unity—the "Baltic Way". This was a symbolic demonstration of the people's call for independence from the Soviet Union.

New elections to the Supreme Soviet took place on 18 March 1990, in which the supporters of independence gained a victory. On 4 May 1990, the new Supreme Soviet of the Latvian SSR adopted a motion, "Declaration of Independence", which called for the restoration of the inter-war Latvian state and the 1922 Constitution.

In January 1991, however, pro-communist political forces attempted to restore Soviet power. With the use of force, attempts were made to overthrow the new assembly. Latvian demonstrators managed to stop the Soviet troops from re-occupying strategic positions, and these events are known as the "Days of the Barricades".

On 19 August 1991, an unsuccessful attempt at a coup d'état took place in Moscow when a small group of prominent Soviet functionaries failed to regain power due to large pro-democracy demonstrations in Russia. This event resulted in Latvia swiftly moving toward independence. After the coup's failure, the Supreme Soviet of the Latvian Republic announced on 21 August 1991, that the transition period to full independence declared on 4 May 1990 had come to an end. Therefore, Latvia was proclaimed a fully independent nation whose judicial foundation stemmed back to the statehood that existed before the occupation on 17 June 1940.

Lithuania

Between 1956 and 1987, open public resistance to the Soviet regime was rare. It became more persistent in the 1970s and 1980s. One example of this could be the Kaunas events of 1972. Many popular singers often used the poetry of nationalist poets such as Bernardas Brazdžionis or Justinas Marcinkevičius, as the lyrics of their songs. In 1987 the Rock March also promoted awareness of the issue among the people.

In 1987, various organisations (mainly environmental ones) were founded. On 3 June 1988, the Sąjūdis, a political and social movement, was established. Some initiators of this movement were active members of environmental organisations, established in 1987 (e. g. Zigmas Vaišvila, Gintaras Songaila). Initially, this organisation supported the regime, but in early autumn of the same year after Lithuania-wide growth, it became an opposing force to the CPL.

In response to this, Sąjūdis became a more centralised organisation. The active nationalist opposition (mostly the Lithuanian Liberty League) towards the regime culminated in various public protests. The most notorious of them took place on 28 October 1988, which ended up with violent dispersal. The resulting public anger caused resignations in the Communist Party of Lithuania (including the then-First Secretary of the party, Ringaudas Songaila, who served just over a year) and replaced them with more moderate members.

As the CPL leadership changed, it decided to return Vilnius Cathedral, formerly used as a museum of fine arts, to the Catholic community on 21 October 1988. The national anthem of Lithuania and the traditional national Tricolore were legalised in Lithuania on 18 November 1988, officially replacing the flag and the anthem of the Lithuanian Soviet Socialist Republic. It was followed by the recognition of the Lithuanian language as a state language, what meant that it became the sole legal language on an institutional level. The latter change was instrumental in the removal of some officials (e. g. Nikolai Mitkin, who served as the Second Secretary of the CPL), but fueled tensions in Polish and Russian speaking communities.

It was followed by the gradual rebuilding of national symbols, which included erecting or restoring independence monuments throughout the country in late 1988 and 1989.

During 1989, various organisations (e. g. The Writers Union) split from the Soviet ones. Prior to the election of the Congress of People's Deputies of the Soviet Union, Sąjūdis media became more restricted, but after the defeat of the CPL (it won just 6 seats of 42, other seats were won Sąjūdis supported candidates), restrictions were lifted. By the end of the year, the CPL gave up its power monopoly and agreed to hold free elections for Supreme Soviet of Lithuanian SSR in 1990, which it lost.

Five decades after Lithuania was occupied and incorporated into the Soviet Union, Lithuania became the first republic to declare its independence from the USSR on 11 March 1990, while Estonia and Latvia declared Soviet rule to have been illegal from the start and since full restoration of independence was not yet feasible, started a period of transition towards independence, culminating with the failure of the August coup. For the same reason, almost all nations in the international community, except Iceland, hesitated to recognise independence for Lithuania until August 1991.

The Soviet military responded harshly. On 13 January 1991, fourteen non-violent protesters in Vilnius died and hundreds were injured defending the Vilnius Television Tower and the Parliament from Soviet assault troops and tanks. Lithuanians refer to the event as Bloody Sunday. The discipline and courage of its citizens - linking arms and singing in the face of tanks and armour-piercing bullets - avoided a much greater loss of life and showed the world that Lithuania's citizens were prepared to defend their national independence.

International governments began recognizing Lithuanian independence after the failure of the coup d'état in August 1991.

Notable protest songs
 "The Baltics Are Waking Up" (LIT/LAT/EST)
 "Brīvību Baltijai" (LAT) ("Freedom for the Baltics")
 "Dzimtā valoda" (LAT) ("Mother tongue")
 Lāčplēsis (LAT) ("Bear slayer")
 "Manai Tautai" (LAT) ("To My Nation")
 "Gaismas pils" (LAT) ("Castle of Light")
 "Pūt, Vējiņi!" – Latvian version of a Livonian wedding folk song ("Pūgõ tūļ") and often used in place of the national anthem during the Soviet era. (LAT) ("Blow, Winds!")
 "Saule, Pērkons, Daugava" (LAT) ("Sun, Thunder, Daugava")
 "Ei ole üksi ükski maa" (EST) ("There is no land alone")
 "Eestlane olen ja eestlaseks jään" (EST) ("I am Estonian and will remain Estonian")
 "Isamaa ilu hoieldes" (EST) ("The beauty of the homeland ")
 "Sind surmani" (EST)
 "Mingem üles mägedele" (EST) ("Let's go up the mountains")
 Laisvė (canonical perf. Eurika Masytė) (LIT) ("Freedom")
 Palaimink Dieve mus (LIT) ("God bless us")
 Dėl Tos Dainos (LIT) ("For That Song")
 Pabudome ir kelkimės (LIT) ("We woke up, now let's get up")
 Kokia nuostabi, Lietuva esi (canonical perf. Kipras Mašanauskas) (LIT) ("How amazing you are, Lithuania")
 Šaukiu aš tautą (canonical perf. Vytautas Kernagis) (LIT) ("I call the nation")
 Tėvyne dainų ir artojų (canonical perf. Rondo) (LIT) ("Homeland of songs and sons of the soil")
 Mano mylimoji / per pasaulio sniegą ... (canonical perf. Gintarė Jautakaitė) (LIT) ("My beloved / through the snow of the world")
 Broli, neverk! (LIT) ("Brother, don’t cry")
 Pīmiņ bruoļ (LTG) ("Remember, brother") Latgalian awakening song.

See also
 Baltic Way
 Forest Brothers
 Revolutions of 1989
 Dissolution of the Soviet Union
 Nonviolent revolution
 Chervona Ruta (festival)

Notes

References

External links

 A Lithuanian history, including information about Bloody Sunday
  Tallinn-Life: A Brief Guide to the Estonian Singing Revolution
 Aadu Jogiaas: Disturbing soviet transmissions in August 1991 Museum of Occupations
 The Singing Revolution, US documentary film of the Estonian Singing Revolution
 General information about The Singing Revolution
 Washington Newsletter - When Songs Trumped Rifles
  Singing Revolution Cantata performance at UIC pavilion, Chicago, IL, Summer, 2015

 
Eastern Bloc
20th-century revolutions
Estonian music
Nonviolent revolutions
Soviet military occupations
Decommunization
Protests
Estonian Soviet Socialist Republic
1988 in Estonia
1988 in Latvia
1988 in Lithuania
1988 in international relations
Dissolution of the Soviet Union
1980s in music
1990s in music
Lithuanian music
Latvian music
Perestroika